Graellsia is a genus of small perennial sub-caespitose herbs in the family Brassicaceae. Most of the species are found in Iran and Afghanistan, with one occurring in Turkey, and one in the High Atlas of Morocco.

The genus was erected in 1842 by Pierre Edmond Boissier, commemorating the Spanish zoologist Mariano de la Paz Graells y de la Agüera. It initially contained only Graellsia saxifragifolia, which had previously been placed in Cochlearia. New species were gradually added, and G. hederifolia was moved to Graellsia, having previously been the only species in Draba sect. Helicodraba. Subsequent investigations using molecular phylogenetics have questioned the grouping of G. hederifolia and G. saxifraga, and G. hederifolia may need to be restored to the genus Draba.

It contains the following species:
Graellsia chitralensis O.E.Schulz
Graellsia davisiana Poulter
Graellsia graellsiifolia (Lipsky) Poulter
Graellsia hederifolia (Coss.) R.D.Hyam & Jury
Graellsia hissarica Junussov
Graellsia integrifolia (Rech.f.) Rech.f.
Graellsia saxifragifolia (DC.) Boiss.
Graellsia stylosa (Boiss. & Hohen.) Poulter

References

Brassicaceae
Brassicaceae genera
Taxa named by Pierre Edmond Boissier